Hirka Polonka is a village in the Lutsk Raion, Volyn Oblast, Ukraine. The village has a population of 2,658.

External links
 Hirka Polonka at the Verkhovna Rada of Ukraine site

Villages in Lutsk Raion